Marharyta Bartashevich (born July 6, 1990) is a Belarusian female acrobatic gymnast. With partner Viktoriya Mikhnovich, Bartashevich achieved 4th in the 2014 Acrobatic Gymnastics World Championships.

References

External links 

 

1990 births
Living people
Belarusian acrobatic gymnasts
Female acrobatic gymnasts
Place of birth missing (living people)